Jonas Andersson Junkka (born May 4, 1976) is a Swedish former professional ice hockey defenceman. He was drafted by the Pittsburgh Penguins in the 1993 NHL Entry Draft, being selected in the 4th round, 104th overall.

Career
Junkka played nine of his ten professional seasons in Europe, the lone exception being when he played for the Syracuse Crunch of the American Hockey League during the 2000-01 season. Although Syracuse was a one-time AHL affiliate of the Pittsburgh Penguins, Junkka joined the team while the Crunch were affiliated with the Columbus Blue Jackets.
At the age of 29 he played his last season in Luleå Hockey (Sweden) but had to retire at that age due to knee and hip injuries.

Career statistics

Regular season and playoffs

International

Awards and accomplishments
1992-1993	U18 EJC Gold Medal
1994-1995	U20 WJC Bronze Medal
1995-1996	Elitserien SM-silver Medal
1998-1999	SM-liiga Bronze Medal

External links

1976 births
Espoo Blues players
HIFK (ice hockey) players
HPK players
Swedish ice hockey defencemen
Living people
Luleå HF players
Modo Hockey players
Pittsburgh Penguins draft picks
Syracuse Crunch players